David Eisenbach is a historian and an expert on media and politics and a lecturer in the history department at Columbia University. He was a Democratic candidate for New York City's Public Advocate in the 2017 primary election, where he received 23.42% and 92,246 votes against incumbent Letitia James. He was also a candidate in the February 2019 non-partisan special election for the same position.

Eisenbach received a B.A. in modern European history from Columbia University, an M.A. in history education from Teachers College, Columbia University, and an M.A. and a PhD in American history from the Columbia Graduate School of Arts and Sciences. At Columbia he teaches courses on the U.S. presidency and media and politics. At the Manhattan School of Music he teaches the great works of Western literature and philosophy, American history, Shakespeare’s tragedies, and the culture and history of the 1960s.

Straight historian Dr. Eisenbach's first book, Gay Power: An American Revolution, published in June 2006, is a history of how the gay rights movement in the 1960s and 1970s transformed American politics and society. The American Library Association named Gay Power a 2007 Stonewall honor book, and it was a finalist for the 2007 Lambda Literary Awards in LGBT Studies.

Eisenbach's second book, The Kingmakers: How the Media Threatens Our Security and Our Democracy, was co-written with Senator Mike Gravel. Publishers Weekly wrote that The Kingmakers "ought to be essential reading for all Americans."

Dr. Eisenbach was the communications director for Senator Mike Gravel's 2008 presidential election campaign.

Along with Larry Flynt, Eisenbach co-wrote One Nation Under Sex (2011) which documents how the private lives of America's most powerful leaders shaped history..

Eisenbach is a featured expert for History Channel productions:

--- Host of the History.com web series "Vote 101;"  
--- A featured historian on the Emmy Award-winning TV series "Great Moments on the Campaign Trial;"
--- Host and co-writer of "The Beltway Unbuckled" (2009), a special on how the sex lives of several presidents shaped American history; and, 
--- Host for the H2 Channel TV series 10 Things You Don't Know About that debuted on February 27, 2012.
---A featured historian on The Making of the Mob: Chicago.

Eisenbach was the celebrity history teacher on Season 2 of the Sundance Channel's Dream School.

In popular culture
David Eisenbach is referenced in "David," the opening track of Nellie McKay's first album, Get Away from Me. "David" begins with "Hcabnesie" ("Eisenbach" backward) sung several times. Eisenbach was one of McKay's professors during her short stay at the Manhattan School of Music.

References

External links
Bio from Manhattan School of Music

Living people
Columbia University faculty
Manhattan School of Music faculty
21st-century American historians
American male non-fiction writers
Teachers College, Columbia University alumni
Year of birth missing (living people)
Columbia College (New York) alumni
21st-century American male writers
Columbia Graduate School of Arts and Sciences alumni